Tchai-Ovna is a speciality tea-house and music venue situated in  the West End of Glasgow. They are known to serve "alternative" teas. They also serve vegetarian and vegan food and allow the rental of Hookah pipes. Tchai-Ovna also provides a place for music, poetry readings and dramatic performances and an arts exhibition space for local artists. It also hosts musical events on most week days, with performances from songwriters, jazz musicians and local and world music artists.

Tchai-Ovna's name is inspired by the teahouses (čajovny) in the Czech Republic. The Glasgow venues are popular, particularly with students, the elderly and members from local bands Belle and Sebastian's 2003 album art for Dear Catastrophe Waitress was shot in Tchai-Ovna's West End venue.

Tchai-Ovna may be forced to close by a proposed new development of luxury flats on Otago Lane. A community campaign to save Otago Lane is attempting to defend it.

See also
 List of restaurants in Scotland

References

External links
 

Music venues in Glasgow
Tea houses of the United Kingdom
Restaurants in Glasgow